Kyriazis is a Greek surname. Notable people with the surname include:

Chrysanthos Kyriazis (born 1972), Greek volleyball player
Damianos Kyriazis (1890–1948), Greek politician and philanthropist
Georgios Kyriazis (born 1980), Greek footballer
Ilias Kyriazis (born 1978), Greek comics artist
Marios Kyriazis (born 1956), British/Greek Cypriot physician
Neoklis Kyriazis (1877–1956), Greek Cypriot historian

Greek-language surnames
Surnames